List matches of Poland men's national volleyball team conducted by Ferdinando De Giorgi, who was announced a coach of Polish national team on December 16, 2016. Head coach failed to draw conclusions from the defeat in the 2017 European Championships, so PZPS fired Ferdinando De Giorgi on September 20.

Achievements

Official matches

2017 FIVB World League

Pool A1

Pool E1

Pool H1

2017 European Championship

 All times are Central European Summer Time (UTC+02:00)

Pool A

Playoffs

Friendly matches

2017

2017 Memoriał Huberta Jerzego Wagnera

References

Polish men's volleyball national team